Ceska or Česká may refer to:

The name of Czech Republic in Czech and the corresponding adjective
Česká, a village and municipality in the Czech Republic
Franz Ceska, Austrian diplomat
Michal Češka, Czech ice dancer